This is a list of research universities in the South Korea classified as Research university or University(Institute) of science and technology in the Ministry of Education (South Korea). Research universities were designated until 1991, universities of science and technology were established until 2007.

Research universities 
South Korean research university() is refers to schools designated as ~Daehakgyo() before December 31, 1991. All S. Korean research universities operate both undergraduate and graduate courses.

Institute of science and technology 
Institutes of science and technology() are science and technology academic research university established by the Government. They do not study various disciplines. However, they focus on science and engineering.

See also 
 Research University
 List of research universities in the United States

Research
Research universities

South Korea Universities